Julia Iwona Nowicka (born ) is a Polish volleyball player. She is part of the Poland women's national volleyball team.

She participated in the  2015 FIVB Volleyball Girls' U18 World Championship,  2017 FIVB Volleyball Women's U20 World Championship, 2018 FIVB Volleyball Women's Nations League, and 2019 Montreux Volley Masters.
On club level she played for BKS Profi Credit Bielsko Biala.

References

External links
 CEV profile

1998 births
Living people
Polish women's volleyball players
Place of birth missing (living people)